Lee Lai Shan  (born 5 September 1970 in Cheung Chau, Hong Kong) is a former world champion and Olympic gold medal-winning professional windsurfer from Hong Kong. She was the first athlete to win an Olympic medal representing Hong Kong.

Sports career 

Lee Lai Shan, popularly known as "San San",  was born in Cheung Chau and started windsurfing aged 12. She began to take part in windsurfing competitions at the age of 17 and joined the Hong Kong team at 19. Over the years, Lee won many international competitions, including the first-ever, and only Olympic gold medal for British Hong Kong, in the women's mistral boardsailing class, at the 1996 Summer Olympics and the first champion in the Asian Games representing Hong Kong when it was a British territory.

Hong Kong had never been able to win any medals for as long as it had participated in the Olympic games since 1952 until Lee Lai Shan's victory at Atlanta 1996. Notably, the 1996 Summer Olympics was the last international sporting event that Hong Kong participated in as a British Dependent Territory, making Lee's medal the first medal that the Hong Kong team (not Hong Kong, China) won." It was at that time Lee famously declared to the media: "Hong Kong athletes are not rubbish!"

After the Games she became a student of sports management at Australia's University of Canberra in 1996. She was the first Hong Kong athlete to be awarded an honorary Doctorate in social sciences by The Chinese University of Hong Kong.

Lee became a recipient of the "Ten Outstanding Young Persons Award" and the Bronze Bauhinia Star Award in recognition of her outstanding achievements in the international sports scene. There is a monument resembling a windsurf board and mast erected in her honour near the beachfront at Cheung Chau.

In the 1997 New Year Honours, she was appointed Member of the Order of the British Empire (MBE) for services to sport.

In 2008, she was the first person to carry the Olympic torch in the torch relay leg in Hong Kong. She was also the final torchbearer in the 2008 Summer Olympics sailing opening ceremony at Qingdao International Marina.

Participation record
1990 Beijing Asian Games – 2nd
1992 Barcelona Olympic Games – 11th
1993 World Championships – 1st
1994 Hiroshima Asian Games – 2nd
1995 World Championships – 3rd
1996 World Championships – 2nd
1996 Atlanta Olympic Games – 1st
1997 World Championships – 1st
1998 Bangkok Asian Games – 1st
2000 Sydney Olympic Games – 6th Mistral
2001 World Championships – 1st
2001 National Games – 1st Mistral
2002 Busan Asian Games – 1st
2004 Athens Olympic Games – 4th Mistral

Honors
1994  – Named Best Athlete of Asia
1995 –1996 & 1999–2000 – Named one of Hong Kong Sports Stars of the Year for four times
1995  – Selected Best Athlete in Hong Kong for 1994
1998  – Voted one of Hong Kong Top Ten Athletes for 1988–1998 by Hong Kong Sports Press Association
1999  – Selected one of China's Top Ten Athletes for 1998 
1999  – Awarded Special Prize in the "Best Athletes of the Century" selection jointly organised by the Chinese Olympic Committee, Henry Fok Foundation and China Sports Press Association

Personal information
Lee married longtime partner Wong Tak-Sum (黃德森) (known in English as Sam Wong), who has also represented Hong Kong internationally in windsurfing, and gave birth to a daughter, Haylie Wong (黃希皚), in August 2005, and to a second daughter, Kallie Wong (黃嘉怡), in August 2007. This was one of the reasons she took a break from competition, though she has not ruled out competing altogether. In 2008, she was involved in the Summer Olympics again when she was one of the presenting team for ATV, in addition to commentating in the sailing event.

In 2006, Lee was featured in a Hang Seng Bank advertisement, in which she said the cost of raising a child in Hong Kong will be HK$4 million (US$510,000). It has caused a slight controversy in Hong Kong as most people do not think it will actually cost that much, and most think that Hang Seng Bank exaggerated the figures.

See also
Sport in Hong Kong

Notes

References

External links

Local Heroes No 29: Lee Lai-shan: Wind in gold medallist's sails
Girl with Midas touch
Savannah's First Medals

ISAF World Sailor of the Year (female)
1970 births
Living people
Olympic sailors of Hong Kong
Hong Kong female sailors (sport)
Sailors at the 1992 Summer Olympics – Lechner A-390
Sailors at the 1996 Summer Olympics – Mistral One Design
Sailors at the 2000 Summer Olympics – Mistral One Design
Sailors at the 2004 Summer Olympics – Mistral One Design
Olympic gold medalists for Hong Kong
Hong Kong windsurfers
Indigenous inhabitants of the New Territories in Hong Kong
Cheung Chau
Olympic medalists in sailing
Asian Games medalists in sailing
Sailors at the 1990 Asian Games
Sailors at the 1994 Asian Games
Sailors at the 1998 Asian Games
Sailors at the 2002 Asian Games
Medalists at the 1996 Summer Olympics
Asian Games gold medalists for Hong Kong
Asian Games silver medalists for Hong Kong
Medalists at the 1990 Asian Games
Medalists at the 1994 Asian Games
Medalists at the 1998 Asian Games
Medalists at the 2002 Asian Games
Members of the Order of the British Empire
Female windsurfers